Cherokee Branch is a stream in the U.S. state of Georgia. It is a tributary to Hurricane Creek.

Cherokee Branch was named after the Cherokee Indians.

References

Rivers of Georgia (U.S. state)
Rivers of Catoosa County, Georgia